Abua (Abuan) is a Central Delta language of Nigeria.

Writing System

References

External links
 Listen to a sample of Abua from Global Recordings Network

Indigenous languages of Rivers State
Central Delta languages